Amy Helen Herring is an American biostatistician interested in longitudinal data and reproductive health. Formerly the Carol Remmer Angle Distinguished Professor of Children's Environmental Health at the University of North Carolina at Chapel Hill, she is now Sara & Charles Ayres Distinguished Professor in the Department of Statistical Science, Global Health Institute, and Department of Biostatistics & Bioinformatics of Duke University.

Education and career
Herring graduated summa cum laude from the University of Mississippi in 1995, with a double major in English and mathematics. She completed an Sc.D in biostatistics at Harvard University in 2000; her dissertation, supervised by Joseph G. Ibrahim, was Missing Covariates in Survival Analysis. 

She joined the North Carolina faculty in 2000, where she became a fellow of the Carolina Population Center in 2006 and Carol Remmer Angle Distinguished Professor of Children's Environmental Health in 2015. She moved to Duke in 2017 as part of a hiring initiative to expand Duke's faculty in the quantitative sciences.

Research

Herring has authored over 275 papers with a focus on statistical methods for correlated data, including longitudinal data and mixed-scale multivariate data. She collaborates extensively with researchers in reproductive, environmental, and global health.

In 2013, a longitudinal study led by Herring and colleagues and published in the British Medical Journal compared the dates of childbirth and of first intercourse reported in separate questions by a sample of American women, and determined that according to this data one out of every 200 women in the US reported dates consistent with giving virgin birth. Herring stated that she found it "highly unlikely" that these women believed themselves to be virgins at the time of their children's births, and suggested that the result might instead be a combination of unintentional inaccuracies by the subjects and of respondents being unwilling to admit to having intercourse.

Awards and honors
In 2010, Herring was elected as a Fellow of the American Statistical Association. She won the Gertrude M. Cox Award for outstanding contributions to applied statistics in 2012. In the same year, the American Public Health Association gave her their Mortimer Spiegelman Award. She won the 2018 Lagakos Distinguished Alumni Award from Harvard University Department of Biostatistics  and the 2019 Janet L. Norwood Award for Outstanding Achievement by a Woman in the Statistical Sciences from the University of Alabama-Birmingham. 

She has provided extensive service to the profession, serving as President of the Eastern North American Region of the International Biometric Society in 2011, as a Director on the Executive Board of the International Biometric Society 2021-2024, as Executive Secretary of the International Society for Bayesian Analysis (ISBA) 2016-2018, and on the ISBA Board 2013-2015; she has also held numerous leadership positions in the American Statistical Association including as Chair-Elect of the Section on Bayesian Statistical Science (2021) and as Chair of the Biometrics Section (2017).

References

External links

Home page

Year of birth missing (living people)
Living people
American statisticians
Women statisticians
University of Mississippi alumni
Harvard University alumni
University of North Carolina at Chapel Hill faculty
Duke University faculty
Fellows of the American Statistical Association
Biostatisticians